FC Aksu is a Kazakhstani football club based in Aksu.

History
On 19 January 2022, Ruslan Kostyshyn was appointed as Aksu's Head Coach.

Domestic history

Honours 
Kazakhstan Second League (1): 2020
Kazakhstan First League (1): 2021

Squad

External links 
on the PFLK website

References

Association football clubs established in 2018
Football clubs in Kazakhstan
2018 establishments in Kazakhstan